Wagawaga is an Oceanic language spoken on the southeastern tip of Papua New Guinea. The Gamadoudou, Soma’a, and Sileba dialects may be a separate language, Yaleba.

External links 
 Paradisec has a collection of Arthur Capell's materials (AC2) which includes Yaleba language materials

References

Nuclear Papuan Tip languages
Languages of Milne Bay Province